Hannah Dreissigacker (born December 2, 1986, in Morrisville, Vermont) is a former American biathlete. She competed at the 2014 Winter Olympics in Sochi.

Career
Dreissigacker comes from a family of Olympic rowers. Her father Richard "Dick" Dreissigacker competed in 1972, her mother Julia "Judy" Geer in 1976 and 1984, and her aunt Charlotte "Carlie" Geer won a silver medal in single sculls in the 1984 Olympics. Her sister Emily Dreissigacker also competed in Biathlon at the 2018 Winter Olympics.

She competed in cross-country skiing for Dartmouth College, where she graduated in 2009 with a degree in engineering and studio art, following in the footsteps of her parents, who were both engineers.

Dreissigacker retired from biathlon in the spring of 2016, although she did subsequently compete in the 2017 edition of the Merino Muster marathon cross-country ski race in New Zealand, where she finished second among the women, behind winner Jessie Diggins.

References

1986 births
Living people
American female biathletes
Olympic biathletes of the United States
Biathletes at the 2014 Winter Olympics
Sportspeople from Vermont
Dartmouth Big Green skiers
Dartmouth College alumni
21st-century American women